Harriot was launched at Rotherhithe in 1787 as a West Indiaman. She made two voyages for the British East India Company (EIC), the first as Harriot and the second as Harriet. After the voyages for the EIC she returned to sailing to the West Indies until circa 1801. She then became a London-based transport until she was last listed in 1813.

Career
Harriot first appeared in Lloyd's Register (LR) in 1787.

1st EIC voyage (1794–1795): The EIC had Harriot measured and surveyed. Captain John Luard sailed from Portsmouth on 1 May 1794, bound for Bengal. Harriot reached Madras on 11 September and arrived at Calcutta on 3 November. Homeward bound, she was at Saugor on 9 January 1795, reached St Helena on 19 March, and arrived back at the Downs on 23 July.

EIC records imply that Georgiana made seven voyages for the company. However, EIC records only account for six. The missing voyage would have occurred at the time Luard was sailing Harriot.

2nd EIC voyage (1796–1797): Captain Charles Patterson sailed from Portsmouth on 14 April 1796, bound for the Cape and St Helena. Harriet was at Simon's Bay on 29 July and Table Bay on 2 September. She reached St Helena on 8 November and arrived at Long Reach on 16 February 1797. On her return from the Cape, Harriet returned to trading with the West Indies.

Harriet was last listed in LR in 1807 with data unchanged since 1801. However, in 1809 she was listed in the Register of Shipping. (The RS for 1807 and 1808 either do not exist, or they exist but are not available on line.)

Fate
Harriet was last listed in RS in 1813. The entry was annotated "See Supplement", but she did not appear in the supplementary pages, or in the 1814 volume.

Notes

Citations

References
 
 
 
 

1787 ships
Ships built in Rotherhithe
Age of Sail merchant ships of England
Ships of the British East India Company